For the archbishop of the same name, see Andrew of Crete.

Saint Andrew of Crete is a martyr of the Christian Church. A fervent iconophile, he was executed in the Forum Bovis of Constantinople at the orders of Emperor Constantine V in 766 or 767, during the Byzantine Iconoclasm.  His feast day is October 17. The monastery of St Andrew in Krisei in Constantinople, currently the Koca Mustafa Pasha Mosque in Istanbul, was dedicated to him. 
It should be noticed that according to modern sources, the figure of Andrew of Crete, like those of many iconophile Saints lived under the iconoclastic period, is unverified.

References

Sources
Attwater, Donald and Catherine Rachel John. The Penguin Dictionary of Saints. 3rd edition. New York: Penguin Books, 1993. .

External links
 http://www.newadvent.org/cathen/01473b.htm
 http://www.catholic.org/saints/saint.php?saint_id=859

Year of birth missing
760s deaths
8th-century Christian saints
8th-century Christian martyrs
8th-century Byzantine people
Byzantine Iconoclasm
Byzantine Crete
Saints of medieval Greece
People of medieval Crete
Executed Byzantine people
8th-century executions by the Byzantine Empire